Michael Smith Bennett (April 10, 1881 – December 26, 1964) was an American football, basketball, and baseball, player, coach, college athletics administrator, dentist, and politician. He played college football for the Penn Quakers, and was the director of athletics and head football coach at Sewanee:The University of the South. Bennett served on the Philadelphia City Council from 1916 to 1917 and was elected in 1917 as a Republican to the Pennsylvania House of Representatives. He did not seek reelection in 1918.

Bennett was born on April 10, 1881. He graduated from the University of Pennsylvania with a Doctor of Dental Surgery degree in 1905. He died on December 26, 1964.

Head coaching record

Football

References

1881 births
1964 deaths
American dentists
American football ends
American men's basketball players
Haverford Fords baseball coaches
Haverford Fords football coaches
Haverford Fords men's basketball coaches
Republican Party members of the Pennsylvania House of Representatives
Penn Quakers football players
Penn Quakers men's basketball players
Philadelphia City Council members
Sewanee Tigers athletic directors
Sewanee Tigers football coaches
Sewanee Tigers men's basketball coaches
Coaches of American football from Pennsylvania
Players of American football from Pennsylvania
Basketball players from Philadelphia
Baseball coaches from Pennsylvania
Basketball coaches from Pennsylvania
20th-century American politicians
20th-century dentists